Romance of the Three Kingdoms III: Dragon of Destiny is the third in the Romance of the Three Kingdoms series of turn-based strategy games produced by Koei and based on the historical novel Romance of the Three Kingdoms. This version was released in Asia and North America for the PC, Super Nintendo Entertainment System and Mega Drive/Genesis. It is also the only  SNES game to be fully translated into Chinese.

Gameplay 

Upon starting the game, players choose from one of six scenarios that determine the initial layout of power in ancient China. The scenarios loosely depict allegiances and territories controlled by the warlords as according to the novel, although gameplay does not follow events in the novel after the game begins.

The six scenarios and the warlords present in each are listed as follows:

Dong Zhuo's reign of terror (AD 189)
Warlords struggle for power (AD 194)
Liu Bei seeks shelter in Xinye (AD 201)
Emergence of the Crouching Dragon (AD 208)
Rise of the Three Kingdoms (AD 221)
Jiang Wei inherits Kongming's legacy (AD 235)

The PC-Engine CD-ROM version includes an additional scenario:
The Yellow Turban Rebellion (AD 184)

After choosing the scenario, players determine which warlord(s) they will control. Custom characters may be inserted into territories unoccupied by other forces. A total of 46 different cities exist, as well as hundreds of unique characters. Each character has several statistics: War Ability, Intelligence, Politics, Charisma, Army Command, Naval Command.

The player wins the game by conquering all territories in China. This is accomplished by being in control of every city on the map.

Reception

Computer Gaming World stated in April 1994 that Romance of the Three Kingdoms III offered a "wondrous" look at an era of Chinese history, praising the game's detail and flexible play options. Mega called it "[o]dd, aloof, but eventually addictive".

References

External links
Japan Gamecity RTK3 page

1992 video games
3
DOS games
FM Towns games
Sega Genesis games
Super Nintendo Entertainment System games
Video game sequels
Turn-based strategy video games
Grand strategy video games
NEC PC-9801 games
Windows games
PlayStation (console) games
X68000 games
TurboGrafx-CD games
Sega CD games
Video games developed in Japan